WTHO-FM (101.7 FM) is a radio station broadcasting a country music format. Licensed to Thomson, Georgia, United States. The station is currently owned by Camellia City Communications, Inc. and features programming from Westwood One.

References

External links

THO-FM
Country radio stations in the United States
Radio stations established in 1971